Kaleigh Michelle Grainger (born Dudley, England, 28 February 1986) is a British unicyclist. She won a gold medal at Unicon X, in China, in 2000 when only 14 years old in the pairs freestyle category.

Kaleigh Grainger, the daughter of Stephen and Elaine Grainger, has been unicycling since she was four years old and learned many skills from her father, a circus skills veteran who currently operates his own travelling circus school. Her mother died in December 2004, aged 46, after a five-year battle against cancer.

In 2001, just after her 15th birthday, Kaleigh became the first unicyclist to appear on Aster and Keli - one of Iceland's most popular children's TV programmes. That year, she also made an appearance at the British Juggling Convention held in Cardiff and performed for the British Ambassador in Washington DC.

In November 2008 Kaleigh qualified as a barrister gaining the BVC from the College of Law, London and being called at Inner Temple where she is a member. Kaleigh gained her law degree from Lancaster University, Lancashire, in 2007, and is a former pupil of Sledmere Primary School in Dudley and St Michael's Church of England High School in nearby Rowley Regis.

References

External links
 Kaleigh Grainger's MySpace page

1986 births
Living people
Alumni of Edge Hill University
Alumni of Lancaster University
Unicyclists